The Women's World Chess Championship 1934 was held in Rotterdam in the Netherlands.

In 1934, reigning Women's World Chess Champion Vera Menchik was challenged by Sonja Graf, another female player who, like Menchik, regularly competed with men in open tournaments.  The match was played in Rotterdam over four games. Menchik was a huge favourite beforehand, but Graf caused a small sensation by winning the first game.  Menchik then won the other three, however, to successfully defend her title.

This was the first time the women's title was put on the line in a match arranged at the personal initiative of two players (much like the open title at the time) and not under the auspices of FIDE.

{| class="wikitable" style="text-align:center"
|+Women's World Chess Championship 1934
|-
! !! 1 !! 2 !! 3 !! 4 !! Points
|-
| align=left | 
| 0 || 1 || 1 || 1 || 3
|-
| align=left | 
| 1 || 0 || 0 || 0 || 1
|}

References 

Women's World Chess Championships
1934 in chess